Skepplanda BTK is a Swedish sports club located in Skepplanda. 

The club nowadays mainly practices football, but earlier also competed in handball, gymnastics and table tennis.

The men's handball team played Division 2 in 1982. The women's soccer team played Division 1 between 2014–2014.

Background
Skepplanda BTK currently plays in Division 5 Västergötland Västra which is the seventh tier of  Swedish football.   They play their home matches at the Forsvallen in Skepplanda. 

The club is affiliated to Västergötlands Fotbollförbund.

Footnotes

External links
 Skepplanda BTK – Official website

Football clubs in Västra Götaland County
1948 establishments in Sweden
Sports clubs established in 1948
Table tennis clubs in Sweden
Gymnastics clubs in Sweden
Swedish handball clubs
Multi-sport clubs in Sweden